Earth & Sky was a daily radio series that presented information about science and nature. It began broadcasting in 1991 and ceased operations in 2013. EarthSky is the ongoing website, serving 21 million users in 2019, according to Google Analytics.

History

Earth & Sky was the creation of producers Deborah Byrd and Joel Block, who were also the hosts.  Byrd had previously created the radio program Star Date that began broadcasting in the US in 1978, and Block was Star Date'''s original host. 

The final episode of Earth & Sky was broadcast on June 2, 2013. President and co-founder Deborah Byrd said that although funding options existed to continue the radio program, a decision was made to stop producing the radio show in order to concentrate on the EarthSky.org website and social media. 

ContentEarth & Sky presented 60- and 90-second radio spots (called "modules") on a wide variety of scientific topics, communicating through terrestrial radio as well as satellite radio and internet radio. Earth & Sky was aired one or more times daily on more than 1,000 commercial, NPR, and other public radio stations, 80 affiliate stations for the sight-impaired, and across 35 channels on both XM and Sirius satellite radio in the United States. Abroad, the programming iwas heard on American Forces Radio, Voice of America Radio, World Radio Network, and others.

The information on Earth & Sky came directly from scientists. The journalists who produced the Earth & Sky radio program spoke to several scientists each day, dozens each week and hundreds each year. More than 500 scientists had joined Earth & Sky as volunteer advisers. Earth & Sky science advisers suggested content, gave feedback, recommended other experts, and reviewed scripts for accuracy before they were recorded for broadcast.Earth & Sky'' featured many fields of science. In 2006, it focused on nanotechnology, women in science, observing the Earth, astrophysics and space, and the human world.

Further reading
Flagg, B. N., Can 90 seconds of science make a difference. Informal Learning Review, The, No. 75, November - December 2005 pp. 2, 22
Multimedia Research.  "Earth & Sky Summative Evaluation, Study 2."  August 2005.
Act 1 Systems.  "Earth & Sky, Inc.: Arbitron DMA Area."  Spring 2003.
Multimedia Research.  "Earth & Sky Summative Evaluation, Study 1."  June 2002.
"With dreams beyond 'Earth & Sky,' show's future is bright."  Austin American Statesman.  10 January 2002.
"'Earth & Sky' is rising star among radio science shows."  Austin American Statesman.  9 November 1992.
"AGU Supports New Earth Science Radio Program."  Earth in Space 4 (2): p. 15 (1991).
"Staff disintegrates at stellar radio program."  Current: The Public Telecommunications Newspaper, Vol. X (13):  (1991).

References

External links
Earth & Sky website

American talk radio programs
Science education
Science radio programmes
1991 radio programme debuts
Science and technology in the United States
2013 radio programme endings